Illara Jothi is a 1954 Indian Tamil-language film, directed by G. R. Rao and produced by Modern Theatres. The film stars Sivaji Ganesan, Padmini and Sriranjani. It was released on 9 April 1954.

Plot

Cast 
Cast according to the opening credits and the song book.

Male cast
 Sivaji Ganesan as Manohar
 Thangavelu as Nettilingam
 K. K. Perumal as Professor
 Thirupathisami as Savadhan Pillai
 M. N. Krishnan as Monk
 Ashokan as Mohan
 Rama Rao as Ameena
 Sethupathi as Unani Doctor
 Kottapuli Jayaraman as Story Seer
 Kittan as Publishing Boss
 Soundar as Rajaman Singh
 Raju

Female cast
 Padmini as Chitrakekha
 Sriranjani as Kaveri
 C. K. Saraswathi as Anantha
 Kamalam as Lakshmi
Dance
 Chandra-Kamala

Production 
Anarkali-Salim drama appeared in a dance-song sequence in this film. Lyricist Kannadasan had claimed in his autobiography that M. Karunanidhi had plagiarised his script, when he (Kannadasan) was serving a jail sentence for his activism as a group leader for the Kallakudi demonstration. The song book, however, does not include Karunanidhi's name for his contribution.

Soundtrack 
The music was composed by G. Ramanathan. Lyrics were by Kannadasan.

References

External links 
 

1950s Tamil-language films
1954 drama films
1954 films
Indian drama films
Films scored by G. Ramanathan